North Hampton State Beach is a one-acre state park located on the Atlantic Ocean in the town of North Hampton, New Hampshire. The park offers swimming at a sandy beach with a bathhouse and metered parking.

References

External links
North Hampton State Beach New Hampshire Department of Natural and Cultural Resources

State parks of New Hampshire
Parks in Rockingham County, New Hampshire
North Hampton, New Hampshire
Beaches of New Hampshire
Protected areas established in 1980
1980 establishments in New Hampshire